The Voice van Vlaanderen is a Belgian reality talent show. The third season of the Flemish version premiered on 7 February 2014 on the vtm television network. The season's finale was on 23 May 2014

Only one of the four coaches for seasons 1 and 2 Koen Wauters remained this season. The other three judges for seasons 1 and 2, Alex Callier, Jasper Steverlinck (winning coach of both seasons) and Natalia Druyts were replaced by Belgian DJ and record producer Regi Penxten, singer Axelle Red and musician, singer and songwriter Bent Van Looy. The title was won by Tom De Man from Team Bent Van Looy.

Contestants
Contestants for the live shows were:

Team Regi
 Cas Vandecruys
 Dunja Mees
 Jamilla Baidou
 Johan Van Royen
 Joke Herremy
 Lisa Gilissen
 Melanie De Saedeleer
 Mikaël Ophoff

Team Koen
 Agnes De Raeve
 Belinda De Bruyn
 Eva De Geyter
 Eva Hendriks
 Laura Tesoro
 Lindsey De Bolster
 Seppe De Rooij
 Steph Van Uytvanck

Team Axelle
 Aurélie Van Rompay
 Dwayne Daeseleire
 Emma Lauwers
 Jessica Ndimubandi
 Koen en Jo Smets
 Laure Mot
 Peter Boone
 Steven Van den Panhuyzen

Team Bent
 Camille Van Wambeke
 Chloé Ditlefsen
 Cristina Sapalo
 Demi Eestermans
 Elie De Prijcker
 Jolan Standaert
 Mandy Nijssen
 Tom De Man

References

3
2014 Belgian television seasons